Copacetic is the debut studio album by American pop punk band Knuckle Puck. Following the release of several EPs and the addition of bassist Ryan Rumchaks, the band began writing material for their debut album. In late December, it was announced the band had signed to Rise Records. The band recorded at Always Be Genius Recording Studio between February and April 2015 with producer Seth Henderson.

Copacetic was released through Rise on July 31. The album sold over 8,000 copies in the first week, charting at number 61 on the Billboard 200. It also charted in the top 20 on several Billboard charts and in the top 50 on several UK charts.

Background
Knuckle Puck formed as a cover band in the fall of 2010 in the outskirts of Chicago. The band consisted of vocalist Joe Taylor, guitarist Kevin Maida and drummer John Siorek. Before the group started writing original songs in April 2011 with the addition of guitarist Nick Casasanto. Since a permanent bass player had not been found, the group had friends fill in on bass. The band released five EPs over the course of three years. Maida explained that the lyrical content in the EPs were about the band's "woes in life and what was bringing us down". In spring 2014 the band recruited bassist Ryan Rumchaks. In October, the band released the last of these EPs, titled While I Stay Secluded. Maida commented that the band had "firmly and confidently" considered the EP their best work so far. In November and December, the band supported Modern Baseball on their fall tour. On December 22, Knuckle Puck announced they had signed to Rise Records and planned to release their debut full-length album in summer 2015. Maida said that Rise would be "a bountiful new home" for them and would help them evolve.

Production
In late 2014 the band started writing material for Copacetic. Maida claimed the band wanted their sound to "cross as many different paths as possible" without it bearing a predictable sound. The group tried "as many new and exciting things as possible" to expand their sound. Maida called the album "a definitive statement" for the band, "it's a new chapter and a new beginning." Maida explained that the material on Copacetic is about "a state of being content" as opposed to life struggles in previous EPs. Maida also said that some songs on the album refer to things that "bother us, but overall it's about saying, 'I'm fine. I'm alright'". "Disdain" is about difficulties with a long-distance relationship and "disdain one can develop for said distance." "Untitled" came about from the band attempting to mix the styles of 1990s emo bands, such as American Football and Mineral.

On February 26, the band announced they had started recording Copacetic, and it was completed on April 1. The album was produced by Seth Henderson at Always Be Genius Recording Studio. Henderson also mixed the album, while Kris Crummett mastered it.

Release
On June 11, 2015, Copacetic was announced along with its track list and artwork. The artwork was done by Ben Sears, who also provided design. On June 19, a music video was released for "Disdain". The video was directed by Max Moore. On June 30, "True Contrite" was made available for streaming. The band played on the 2015 edition of Warped Tour. On July 6, "Disdain" and "True Contrite" were released as singles. On July 14, "Pretense" was made available for streaming. On July 23, the album was made available for streaming. Copacetic was released on July 31 through Rise. On August 10, a music video for "True Contrite" was released. The video features Casasanto's brother and was directed by Moore. The video was filmed twice: one with polaroids on the wall, and the other with nothing on the walls. Maida said the video was "one of the most painstaking, rewarding experiences ever". The band supported State Champs on their European tour in September and October. Knuckle Puck toured the U.S. in October and November, with support from Seaway, Head North and Sorority Noise.

On February 11, 2016, a music video was released for "Pretense". The video was directed by YEAH! Films and filmed in Canada a few weeks prior. In February and March, the band supported Neck Deep and State Champs on their co-headlining U.S. tour. In March and April, the band went on their first UK headlining tour with support from Seaway and Boston Manor. The band went on the 2016 edition of Warped Tour. From mid October to late November, the band supported The Wonder Years on their tour of the U.S. The band supported Real Friends on their tour of the UK in December 2016.

Reception

Critical response
Reviewing the album for Rock Sound, Jack Rogers said it delivers "the sort of shirt tugging poignancy" the band are known for. Rogers mentioned that album shows off "their emotionally dented style" beating their peers. Overall, he noted that they "invested every ounce" of themselves to create a "damn fine pop-punk debut." Cleveland.com reviewer Troy L. Smith noted that people who liked early 2000s pop punk albums such as Simple Plan's No Pads, No Helmets...Just Balls (2002) and New Found Glory's Sticks and Stones (2002) would enjoy Copacetic. Smith wrote that Taylor's vocals was "a nice change of pace" compared to pop punk's typical "whiny vocals". Smith ended with making mention of the band taking risks, such as the eight-minute closing track "Untitled". AllMusic reviewer Timothy Monger noted the album's sound "[r]anging from blazing, epic emo and pop-punk to slower, more contemplative fare."

Punknews.org staff member RENALDO69 wrote that the album had "subtle new bends in it" but kept to the band's sound of their EPs. RENALDO69 clarified that although this wasn't "a bad thing", the album was weighed down by "too much cookie-cutter and filler". They mentioned that the band leaned towards a "more pop side of the punk spectrum", resulting in the album sounding "a bit stagnant." AbsolutePunk reviewer Blake Solomon wrote that the group's sound had matured, providing "instrumental denouements" and "actually interesting" slow-paced songs. He noted that album did "an admirable job recreating the peaks and valleys of sorrow." Solomon mentioned how pop punk was a genre that references the past, while closing with the album being "just as interested in our uncertain futures."

Commercial performance and accolades
Copacetic sold 8,482 copies in the first week, charting in the U.S. at number 61 on the Billboard 200. The album also charted at number 3 on the Hard Rock Albums chart, number 4 on both the Alternative Albums and Top Internet Albums charts, number 5 on the Independent Albums chart, and number 6 on the Top Rock Albums and Vinyl Albums charts. The album charted in the UK at number 12 on the Independent Album Breakers chart, number 28 on the Rock & Metal Albums chart, and number 47 on the Independent Albums chart.

Copacetic was included at number 9 on Rock Sounds top 50 releases of 2015 list. It was also nominated for Album Of The Year at the 2016 Alternative Press Music Awards. Cleveland.com ranked "Disdain" at number 87 on their list of the top 100 pop-punk songs.

Track listing
All tracks written by Knuckle Puck.

Personnel
Personnel per booklet.

Knuckle Puck
 Nick Casasanto – rhythm guitar, co-lead vocals
 Kevin Maida – lead guitar
 Ryan Rumchaks – bass
 John Siorek – drums
 Joe Taylor – lead vocals
 Dan Lambton - (Guest vocals on Evergreen)

Production
 Seth Henderson – producer, mixing
 Ben Sears – art, design
 Kris Crummett – mastering

Chart performance

References
Footnotes

Citations

Sources

External links

Copacetic at YouTube (streamed copy where licensed)

2015 albums
Rise Records albums
Knuckle Puck albums